Labruyère-Dorsa is a small rural village and commune in the Haute-Garonne department in southwestern France.

Geography
The commune is bordered by four other communes: Issus to the northeast, Auragne to the east, Auterive to the south, and finally by Grépiac to the west.

Population

See also
Communes of the Haute-Garonne department

References

Communes of Haute-Garonne